Woman with a Suitcase is a 2016 South Korean television series starring Choi Ji-woo, Joo Jin-mo, Jeon Hye-bin and Lee Joon.  It aired on MBC every Monday and Tuesday at 22:00 (KST) from September 26 to November 15, 2016 for 16 episodes.

Plot
The series tells the story of how Cha Geum-joo (Choi Ji-woo) went from a disgraced manager at a law firm to a great attorney.

Cast

Main
Choi Ji-woo as Cha Geum-joo
Joo Jin-mo as Ham Bok-geo
Jeon Hye-bin as Park Hye-joo
Lee Joon as Ma Seok-woo

Supporting
Golden Tree
Jin Kyung as Goo Ji-hyun
Kim Byung-choon as Chief Hwang
Bae Noo-ri as Oh An-na

K-Fact
Choi Dae-sung as Go Goo-tae
Ji Yi-soo as Baek Jin-seo
Choi Tae-hwan as Choi Hoon-suk

Others
Jang Hyun-sung as Lee Dong-soo
 Park Byung-eun as Prosecutor Kang
Kim Min-ji as Seo Ji-ah
Kim Young-pil as Lee Sang-yup
Im Ji-hyun as Na Mi-sun
Jung Yoo-jin as Madam Choi
Choi Won-hong as Oh Kyung-hwan
Yoon Ji-min as Jo Ye-ryung
Oh Yeon-ah as Han Ji-won
Min Sung-wook as Prosecutor Choi

Cameo
 Jo Jae-yoon as Na Gil-tae, Geum Joo's client (episode 1)
Thunder as Cheondung (episode 5)
Tae Jin-ah as himself (episode 9)

Original soundtrack

OST Part 1

OST Part 2

OST Part 3

OST Part 4

OST Part 5

OST Part 6

Ratings 
 In the table below, the blue numbers represent the lowest ratings and the red numbers represent the highest ratings.
 NR denotes that the drama did not rank in the top 20 daily programs on that date.

Awards and nominations

References

External links
  
 

Korean-language television shows
2016 in South Korean television
2016 South Korean television series debuts
2016 South Korean television series endings
MBC TV television dramas
Television series by Studio Dragon
South Korean legal television series